Allium constrictum, the Grand Coulee Onion, is a plant species endemic to the US State of Washington. It is known from only three counties in the east-central part of the state: Douglas, Grant, and Lincoln. It grows on dry, sandy soils at elevations of 300–500 m.

Allium constrictum produces egg-shaped bulbs up to 8 mm long. Flowers are up to 10 mm across, pink to rose with green midrib; anthers and pollen blue to gray

References

constrictum
Flora of Washington (state)
Onions